Uzun Hasan or Uzun Hassan ( اوزون حسن; ; 1423 – January 6, 1478;  where uzun means "tall" in Oghuz Turkic) was a ruler of the Turkoman Aq Qoyunlu state and is generally considered to be its strongest ruler. Hasan ruled between 1452 and 1478, and would preside over the confederation's territorial apex when it included parts or all of present-day Iraq, Turkey, Azerbaijan, Iran, Transcaucasia and Syria.

Reign 

Timur, the founder and ruler of the Timurid Empire, had appointed Uzun Hasan's grandfather, Kara Yülük Osman, as a governor of Diyarbakır, with the cities of Erzincan, Mardin, Ruha (or Urfa), and Sivas. Later, Persia was divided between two Timurid rulers, Jahan Shah of Qara Qoyunlu (the Black Sheep Turkoman) and Uzun Hasan. After twenty years of fighting, Uzun Hasan eventually defeated Jahan Shah in a battle near the sanjak of Çapakçur in present-day eastern Turkey on October 30 (or November 11), 1467. Upon the defeat of the latter, another Timurid ruler, Abu Sa'id Mirza, answered Jahan Shah's son's request for aid, taking much of Jahan Shah's former land and going to war with Uzun Hasan despite the latter's offers of peace. Uzun Hasan then ambushed and captured Abu Sa'id at the Battle of Qarabagh, whereupon he was executed by Yadgar Muhammad Mirza, a rival.

In 1463, the Venetian Senate, seeking allies in its war against the Ottomans, sent Lazzaro Querini as its first ambassador to Tabriz, but he was unable to persuade Uzun Hassan to attack the Ottomans. Hassan sent his own envoys to Venice in return. 

In 1465, Hassan attacked and captured Harput from the Beylik of Dulkadir.

In 1471, Querini returned to Venice with Hazzan's ambassador Murad. The Venetian Senate voted to send another to Persia, choosing Caterino Zeno after two other men declined. Zeno, whose wife was the niece of Uzun Hassan's wife, was able to persuade Hassan to attack the Turks. Hassan was successful at first, but there was no simultaneous attack by any of the western powers.

Uzun Hasan met the Ottomans in battle near Erzincan in 1471, advanced as far as Akşehir, pillaging and destroying Tokat, and fought a battle at Tercan in 1473. He was defeated by Mehmed II at Battle of Otlukbeli in the late summer of 1473.

In 1473, Giosafat Barbaro was selected as another Venetian ambassador to Persia, due to his experience in the Crimean, Muscovy, and Tartary. Although Barbaro got on well with Uzun Hassan, he was unable to persuade the ruler to attack the Ottomans again. Shortly afterwards, Hassan's son Ughurlu Muhammad, rose in rebellion, seizing the city of Shiraz.

After yet another Venetian ambassador, Ambrogio Contarini, arrived in Persia, Uzun Hassan decided that Contarini would return to Venice with a report, while Giosafat Barbaro would stay. Barbaro was the last Venetian ambassador to leave Persia after Uzun Hassan died in 1478. While Hassan's sons fought each other for the throne, Barbaro hired an Armenian guide and escaped.

According to Contarini, ambassador to Uzun Hasan's court from 1473 to 1476, "The king is of a good size, with a thin visage and agreeable countenance, and seemed to be about seventy years old. His manners were very affable, and he conversed familiarly with everyone around him, but I noticed that his hands trembled when he raised the cup to his lips." His name means "tall" and Contarini reported that he was also "very lean".

Contarini also wrote, "The empire of Uzun-Hassan is very extensive and is bounded by Turkey and Caramania, belonging to the Sultan, and which latter country extends to Aleppo. Uzun-Hassan took the kingdom of Persia from Causa, whom he put to death. The city of Ecbatana, or Tauris, is the usual residence of Uzun-Hassan; Persepolis or Shiras ..., which is twenty-four days journey from thence, being the last city of his empire, bordering on the Zagathais, who are the sons of Buzech, sultan of the Tartars, and with whom he is continually at war. On the other side is the country of Media, which is under subjection to Sivansa, who pays a kind of yearly tribute to Uzun-Hassan. It is said that he has likewise some provinces on the other side of the Euphrates, in the neighbourhood of the Turks. The whole country, all the way to Ispahan... is exceedingly arid, having very few trees and little water, yet it is fertile in grain and other provisions.

"His eldest son, named Ogurlu Mohamed, was much spoken of when I was in Persia, as he had rebelled against his father. He had other three sons; Khalil Mirza, the elder of these was about thirty-five years old, and had the government of Shiras. Yaqub Beg, another son of Uzun-Hassan, was about fifteen, and I have forgotten the name of a third son. By one of his wives, he had a son named Masubech, or Maksud beg, whom he kept in prison because he was detected corresponding with his rebellious brother Ogurlu, and whom he afterward put to death. According to the best accounts which I received from different persons, the forces of Uzun-Hassan may amount to about 50,000 cavalries, a considerable part of whom are not of much value. It has been reported by some who were present, that at one time he led an army of 40,000 Persians to battle against the Turks, for the purpose of restoring Pirameth to the sovereignty of Karamania, whence he had been expelled by the infidels.

Family

Consorts
Uzun Hasan had four wives:
Seljuk Shah Khatun, daughter of his paternal uncle, Kur Muhammad
Jan Khatun, daughter of Daulat Shah Buldukani
Tarjil Khatun, daughter of Omer Zaraki
In 1458 Uzun Hasan married Theodora Megale Komnene, the daughter of Emperor John IV of Trebizond, better known in histories as Despina Khatun.

Sons
Uzun Hasan had at least seven sons: 
Ughurlu Muhammad (before 1441 - 1477) – with Jan Khatun. After failing to seize the throne, he fled to Constantinople, where he was taken in by the Ottoman Sultan Mehmed II, who gave him his daughter Gevherhan Hatun in marriage. Their son, Ahmad Beg, in turn married an Ottoman princess, Aynişah Sultan, daughter of Bayezid II, and managed to seize the throne for himself, but died soon after in an attempt to keep it. 
Mirza Khalil Beg ( 1441 - 1478) – with Seljuk Shah Khatun. He toke the throne after his father and proclamed himself sultan.
Yaqub Beg ( 1461 - 1490) – with Seljuk Shah Khatun. After defeating and executing his brother Khalil, he became sultan.  
Maqsud Beg (? - 1478) – with Despina Khatun. Executed by Khalil in 1478. 
Yusuf Beg (? - ?) – with Seljuk Shah Khatun. Exiled by Khalil in 1478. 
Masih Beg (? - before 1473) – with Despina Khatun
Zegnel Beg (? - before 1473) – with Tarjil Khatun

Daughters
Uzun Hassan had at least three daughters: 
 Halima Alamshah Khatun (1460–1522). She married her cousin Shaykh Haydar (son of Khadija Khatun, sister of her father, and Shaykh Junayd) in 1471/1472. They had three son and four daughters. One of them was Shah Ismail I, father of Shah Tahmasp I. She was called Martha in Christian sources.
 Two unnamed daughters - with Despina Khatun. They were still alive in 1473.

Legacy 
Uzun Hasan ordered the Quran to be translated into Turkic.

He initiated some financial and administrative reforms to weaken the separatism of the military and tribal nobility and to strengthen his vast state.

The sources do not provide detailed information about Uzun Hasan's reformist activities. Although the texts of his laws have not reached us, it is possible to judge the reforms on the basis of little information about the laws that the chroniclers called "King Hasan's Laws" or "Dasturi-Hasan Bey". Some documents related to the western territories of the Aq Qoyunlu state, which became part of the Ottoman Empire (Diyarbakir, Mardin, Urfa, etc.) are kept in the Turkish archives. These sources are important in terms of studying feudal relations in the provinces of the Aq Qoyunlu. The general nature of Uzun Hasan's reform is stated in "Tarikh al-Qiyasi":

"Uzun Hasan was fair and kind. He wanted to abolish taxes throughout the country. But the emirs did not agree with him. The Sultan then reduced the taxes by half to twenty-one dirhams ... He clarified the amount of taxes collected in the whole country. Uzun Hasan demanded that lawbreakers be severely punished. The Sultan "sent the law to every province of the State to put into effect."

After the conquest of eastern Anatolia in 1517–18, and of Iraq in 1537, the Ottomans preserved the laws of Uzun Hasan (Qānūn-nāma-ye Ḥasan Pādšāh). It was after 1540, that the Ottoman regulations replaced the Aq Qoyunlu code. Large parts of his tax and trade laws are recorded in Ottoman sources.

References

External links
 A General History and Collection of Voyages and Travels – Volume 02 eBook

Sources

Further reading
 

Aq Qoyunlu rulers
1423 births
1478 deaths
15th-century monarchs in the Middle East
Leaders who took power by coup
Shahanshahs